The effects of Hurricane Isabel in New Jersey in 2003 were overall moderate, limited to fallen trees, two deaths, and $50 million in damage (2003 USD, $59 million 2008 USD). Hurricane Isabel formed from a tropical wave on September 6 in the tropical Atlantic Ocean. It quickly weakened over land and became extratropical over western Pennsylvania the next day. Several days before Isabel made landfall, there existed uncertainty in where the hurricane would strike. At least one computer model predicted a landfall on New Jersey, and as a result services across the state thoroughly prepared for the hurricane.

The winds downed hundreds of trees and power lines, leaving hundreds of thousands without power. A falling tree killed one person. Hurricane Isabel produced rough waves and a moderate storm surge along the coastline. One person was killed from the rough waves, and at least 50 locations along the Jersey Shore reported beach erosion from the hurricane.

Preparations 

44 hours before Hurricane Isabel made landfall on the Outer Banks of North Carolina, the National Hurricane Center issued tropical storm watch for the coastline from Little Egg Inlet southward into the Mid-Atlantic. A day later, the watch was extended northward to Sandy Hook. When Isabel was 26 hours from making landfall, the watches were changed to tropical storm warnings, and 10 hours before it struck land the National Hurricane Center issued a tropical storm warning for the remainder of the New Jersey coastline. The National Hurricane Center also briefly issued a hurricane watch for the New Jersey coastline. By four days before the hurricane struck land, at least one computer model predicted Isabel would strike New Jersey.

News stations were stationed with crews along the Jersey shore several days in advance of Isabel to provide breaking news and live conditions. Many residents prepared their houses by boarding windows and purchasing emergency supplies. The Sussex County chapter of the American Red Cross advised local high schools to be on stand-by as potential shelters in the event evacuation occurred. Emergency coordinators in several counties were on alert, though none issued evacuations. In preparation for anticipated power outages, the Jersey Central Power and Light company arranged to receive more electrical crews from its parent company, FirstEnergy. Other utility workers from various locations as far as Canada left for the state in the event of power outages.

Several flights in and out of the state were delayed or canceled, and the Cape May-Lewes Ferry canceled travel across the Delaware Bay during the duration of Isabel. In Atlantic City, casino workers prepared for coastal flooding by placing sandbags at boardwalk entrances. New Jersey Transit workers secured its buses, railways, and light rail equipment. To ensure service would remain accessible during and after the hurricane, NJ Transit prepared backup generators, pumps, and chainsaws, with workers inspecting trains and the paths of the lines. FEMA mobilized and dispatched an Urban Search and Rescue Task Force of 28 people to the state for possible rescue duty. Days before the storm made landfall, the Salvation Army prepared food and aid for potentially affected citizens. In anticipation for the effects of Isabel, Governor Jim McGreevey declared a state of emergency, which allowed the Federal Emergency Management Agency to deal with the situation.

Impact 
Wildwood along the southeast coast reported  of rain, while Lincoln Park in the northern portion of the state recorded  of precipitation. The large wind field of the hurricane produced moderate winds across the state.

Hurricane Isabel produced slightly above normal tides and rough surf along the Jersey shore, killing one surfer off of Wildwood Crest. The combination of gusty winds and the heavy surf produced moderate beach erosion along much of the coastline, primarily to beaches facing southeastward. In the Delaware Bay and River area, no significant erosion was reported, though coastal flooding from the hurricane washed out a road and destroyed the deck of a house in Baypoint. Waves from Isabel in Atlantic County resulted in light damage, minor coastal flooding, and slight beach erosion.

Moderate wind gusts throughout the state downed hundreds of trees, tree limbs, and power lines. Over 382,000 people were without power, one of the worst power outages on record for area utilities. Downed trees and power lines closed major streets and schools in Union County. One downed tree greatly damaged a house in Middletown, and in Hudson County several trees fell onto and damaged cars. A downed tree in Englewood injured a woman when she was struck, and a woman in Independence Township was killed when a fallen tree landed on the vehicle she was driving. Strong winds from Isabel blew out the windows in an office building in East Rutherford, causing injuries to two women when they were struck. Throughout the state, damage totaled to about $50 million (2003 USD, $59 million 2008 USD).

See also 

 List of New Jersey hurricanes
 List of retired Atlantic hurricane names

References

External links 
 National Hurricane Center Tropical Cyclone Report

New Jersey
Isabel (2003)
2003 in New Jersey
Isabel